The brown nunlet (Nonnula brunnea) is a species of near-passerine bird in the family Bucconidae, the puffbirds, nunlets, and nunbirds. It is found in Colombia, Ecuador, and Peru.

Taxonomy and systematics

The brown nunlet is monotypic. Its relationship to others of its genus has not been detailed but it is believed to be most closely related to the rusty-breasted nunlet (N. rubecula) and fulvous-chinned nunlet (N. sclateri) and may form a superspecies with them. It has sometimes been considered conspecific with the latter, and alternatively as conspecific with grey-cheeked nunlet (N. frontalis) and rufous-capped nunlet (N. ruficapilla).

Description

Its crown and upperparts are plain brown. It has a buffy rufous band from the bill to the eye, a narrow buffy ring around the eye, and dark grayish brown cheeks. The throat and flanks are dark rufous, and the chin and breast pale rufous. The belly is buffy rufous. The bill, eye, and feet are dark.

Distribution and habitat

The brown nunlet is found from south-central Colombia through eastern Ecuador into northern Peru. It inhabits humid lowland terra firme forest and dense secondary forest. It tends to remain below the canopy.

Behavior

Feeding

Almost nothing is known about the brown nunlet's feeding behavior or diet. It has been observed joining flocks of Myrmotherula antwrens.

Breeding

One nest of the brown nunlet was a trench excavated in the ground and roofed with sticks and leaves. Its close relative the rusty-breasted nunlet also nests in a shallow scrape that it covers with twigs and leaves. That species' clutch size is usually four eggs.

Vocalization

The brown nunlet's song is "a series of 20–25 'treeu' notes, repeated steadily, starting quietly, building up, and then fading again towards end."

Status

The IUCN has assessed the brown nunlet as being of Least Concern, though its population is unknown and believed to be decreasing. It appears to be rare to uncommon across its range.

References

External links
Brown Nunlet photo gallery VIREO 
Photos and videos on Birds of the world

brown nunlet
Birds of the Colombian Amazon
Birds of the Ecuadorian Amazon
Birds of the Peruvian Amazon
brown nunlet
brown nunlet
Taxonomy articles created by Polbot